Chen Yucheng, born Chen Picheng (1837May 1862), was a Chinese general during the Taiping Rebellion and later served as the Heroic (Ying) Prince (or Brave King) of the Taiping Heavenly Kingdom in the later stages of the rebellion, nicknamed "Four-eyed Dog" because of two prominent moles below his eyes.

Born to a peasant family in Guangxi around 1836, Chen Yucheng joined Taiping rebel forces during the March to the Yangtze in 1851. 15 years old at the time of his enlistment, Chen quickly rose through the ranks and in 1856, in the aftermath of the Tianjing incident, an internal power struggle within the Taiping leadership, he was promoted to a general. He was awarded the E An in 1857.

After commanding a series of successful military operations west of Nanking (Nanjing) between 1856 and 1858, Chen was given the title of Prince Ying by the Taiping Kings in the following year. Together with fellow Taiping General Li Xiucheng, Chen defended and released the capital during the siege of Nanking in 1860.

In February 1861, Chen Yucheng led 100,000 troops in a preparation to attack Wuhan, leading one half of a pincer movement in an offensive against Imperial forces. However, he was on the defensive and forced to withdraw. After his retreat the Xiang Army concentrated all its forces on the Siege of Anqing.

Chen was executed by Imperial Qing forces in May 1862.

References

Michael, Franz. The Taiping Rebellion: History and Documents (Vol. II/III), Seattle, 1971.
Michael, Franz and Chang Chung-li, The Taiping Rebellion: History and Documents (Vol. I), Seattle, 1966.
Teng, Ssu-yu. New Light on the Taiping Rebellion, Cambridge, Mass., 1950.

1836 births
1862 deaths
19th-century executions by China
Hakka people
Hakka generals
Executed people from Guangxi
Executed Taiping Heavenly Kingdom people
Military leaders of the Taiping Rebellion
People executed by flaying
People executed by the Qing dynasty
People from Wuzhou
Qing dynasty people